The Monte Carlo Show was a variety show produced in Monte Carlo and presented by Patrick Wayne. The show featured a French puppet sidekick Ploom the Caterpillar, created by puppeteer André Tahon.  The show was taped live in Monaco and featured talent from around the world.  The series was broadcast in the USA in 1980.

International Broadcast
In 1981, the series was broadcast in the UK by ITV, and in 1982, The Benny Hill Show did a parody called The Monte Carbolic Show.

References

External links
 https://web.archive.org/web/20111001101513/http://www.researchvideo.com/footage-libraries/monte-carlo-show.html
 https://www.imdb.com/title/tt0080247/
 BFI.org

1980 American television series debuts
1980 American television series endings
1980s American variety television series
Television series by 20th Century Fox Television